Radford High School may refer to:

Radford High School (Virginia) in Radford, Virginia
Admiral Arthur W. Radford High School in Honolulu, Hawaii

See also
 Radford College, in Bruce, ACT, Australia; a co-ed K-12 day school
 Radford (disambiguation)